Maktha was a land grant in India similar to a jagir. The grants were of several kinds and were known under different expressions, such as jagir, samasthan, maktha, and inam. If the grant was of a whole village, it was generally referred to as a jagir or samasthan, but if the grant pertained only to a certain land in a given village, it was called an inam or maktha.

Indian feudalism
Economic history of India